The PWZ Zuidenveld Tour, formerly the Zuid Oost Drenthe Classic, is a road bicycle race held annually in the Netherlands. It has been organized as a 1.2 event on the UCI Europe Tour since 2013.

Winners

References

UCI Europe Tour races
Cycle races in the Netherlands
Recurring sporting events established in 1992